Esther Haase (born 20 February 1966) is a German photographer. She currently maintains residences in Hamburg and London.

Biography
Haase was born in Bremen, the first daughter of illustrator Sibylle Haase-Knels and Fritz Haase. Her father worked as a professor of communication design at the University of the Arts Bremen. In 1963 her parents founded a studio for design.

Haase spent her childhood in Bremen. After professional training in modern dance in Cologne, she spent two years (1986–1989) on-stage, joining the dance group of the Goethe Theatre, Bremen. From 1988 to 1993, she studied graphic design with a focus on photography at the University of the Arts Bremen.

Work
Whilst studying at the University of the Arts, Haase was trainee at the art department of Men's Vogue in Munich. After graduation she moved to Berlin and started working internationally as a freelance photographer. She has shot fashion stories and editorials for Elle, Vanity Fair, Madame Figaro, Vogue India and others. She made portraits of various Germans such as Diane Kruger, Hildegard Knef, Karl Lagerfeld, Franka Potente, Regina Halmich, Christine Kaufmann and Nena; international celebrities Dita von Teese, Jessica Alba, fashion designers Domenico Dolce & Stephano Gabbana, Vivienne Westwood, Roberto Cavalli, Donatella Versace; musicians Marilyn Manson, Anastacia; worked for fashion brands Victoria's Secret, Guess, Wonderbra and Escada; and did advertising and campaign photography for Moët & Chandon, Chopard, Mercedes-Benz and Chrysler.

Haase has had exhibitions in various international galleries and museums.

Books
Fashion in Motion. Thalwil/Zürich: Stemmle, 2000. Edited by Wolfgang Behnken, . With texts by Wolfgang Behnken and Roberta Armani.
Sexy Book. Zurich: Scalo, 2006. .
Famous. 2007.
Esther Haase: Fotografien 1997–2006. Bremen: Hachmann, 2007. .
Short Stories. 2009.
Rock'n Old. Heidelberg: Kehrer, 2010. .
Amazonen: das Brustkrebsprojekt von Uta Melle. Heidelberg: Kehrer, 2011. Edited by Nadine Barth. Photographs by Haase, Beate Wedekind, Sophie Albers, Jackie Hardt. .
Short Stories II. 2013.

Personal
Haase lives in Hamburg and London with her husband and their son and her daughter.

References

External links
 
 

1966 births
Living people
Mass media people from Bremen
Fashion photographers
Portrait photographers
20th-century German photographers
German women photographers
University of the Arts Bremen alumni
20th-century German women artists
21st-century German photographers
21st-century German women artists
Photographers from Bremen (state)
20th-century women photographers
21st-century women photographers